Allocasuarina corniculata, commonly known as Tamma or the Tamma sheoak,  is a shrub of the genus Allocasuarina native to the Wheatbelt and Goldfields-Esperance regions of Western Australia.

It produces red flowers between September and January and is found in tall heath growing in sandy, gravelly or lateritic soils.

References

corniculata
Rosids of Western Australia
Fagales of Australia
Dioecious plants
Taxa named by Ferdinand von Mueller